Microcrambus flemingi is a moth in the family Crambidae. It was described by Stanisław Błeszyński in 1967. It is found in Trinidad.

References

Crambini
Moths described in 1967
Moths of the Caribbean